Sir Anthony Foster Abell  (11 December 1906 – 8 October 1994) was a British colonial official who was the Governor of Sarawak and British High Commissioner to Brunei.

Career
Abell was born in Bridgnorth, Shropshire, on 11 December 1906, the son of George and Jessie Abell, his father was a Bank Manager.
Abell (brother of George Abell, who became a civil servant) was educated at Repton School and Magdalen College, Oxford, though he failed to get a degree. He joined the then Colonial Administrative Service in 1929 and was posted to Nigeria. In 1942 he took part in Operation Postmaster, a successful raid on German and Italian ships in the port of Santa Isabella on Fernando Po, then a Spanish colony, although Spain was neutral in World War II. He was appointed Resident of Oyo Province in western Nigeria in 1949, but the following year he was offered the governorship of Sarawak, where he was concurrently High Commissioner to Brunei.

During the opening ceremony of the Brunei Airport by Sultan Omar Ali Saifuddien III on 8 May 1957, he was there to attend and witness the ceremony together with other officials. On 17 December 1958, Abell flew from Kuching to Brunei after being invited by Dennis White to officiate the opening of his namesake school in Seria, Anthony Abell College on the next day. He would return back to Kuching on the following day.

Later life and death
Abell retired in 1959 but was a member of selection boards for both the Colonial Service and the police, and was also invited to sit on the Cobbold Commission on the future of North Borneo and Sarawak. He was Gentleman Usher of the Blue Rod 1972–79. 

Abell died on 8 October 1994 in Winchester district of Hampshire aged 87.

Legacy

Namesakes 

 Anthony Abell College, a college in Seria, Belait District of Brunei.

Honours 
Abell was appointed CMG in 1950 and knighted KCMG in the 1952 New Year Honours. In 1954 the Sultan of Brunei awarded him the Family Order of Brunei, First Class, "in recognition of valuable services rendered".

National 
  Companion of the Order of St Michael and St George (CMG) (1950)
  Knight Commander of the Order of St Michael and St George (KCMG) – Sir (1952)

Foreign 
:
  Second Class of the Order of Seri Paduka Mahkota Brunei (DPMB) – Dato Paduka (1954)

References

1906 births
1994 deaths
People educated at Repton School
Alumni of Magdalen College, Oxford
Colonial Administrative Service officers
Governors of Sarawak
High Commissioners of the United Kingdom to Brunei
Knights Commander of the Order of St Michael and St George
People from Bridgnorth